The Belareca or Bela Reca is a right tributary of the river Cerna in Romania. It discharges into the Cerna near the town Băile Herculane.

References

Rivers of Romania
Rivers of Caraș-Severin County